The tables below indicate the political party affiliation of elected officials in the U.S. State of Michigan from statehood through the results of the November 2022 elections.

Officials listed include: Governors, Lieutenant Governors, Secretaries of State, Attorneys General/State Treasurers. The tables also indicate the historical party composition in the State Senate, State House of Representatives, the names and party affiliations of  Michigan's U.S. Senators, and the party composition of Michigan's delegations to the U.S House of Representatives. For years in which a presidential election was held, the tables show which party's nominees received the State's electoral votes.

1837–1899

1900–1964

In 1963, the Michigan Constitution was rewritten, modifying the statewide elected positions.

1965–present

See also
Politics in Michigan
Elections in Michigan

References
 Party organization and machinery in Michigan since 1890, By Arthur Chester Millspaugh (1917) The Johns Hopkins Press Baltimore
 Livingstone's history of the Republican party, A history of the Republican party from its foundation to the close of the campaign of 1900

Politics of Michigan
Government of Michigan
Michigan